Mann v Goldstein [1968] 1 WLR 1091 is a UK insolvency law case concerning the bringing of a winding up petition when a company is alleged to be unable to repay its debts.

Facts
Peter and Anita Mann sought an injunction against a winding up petition by Mr Sidney Goldstein and his wife, as well as Wallander Laboratories Ltd, on the ground that the debts were under dispute. The four people were equal shareholders in two hairdressing businesses, Joanita Ltd in Pinner, London, managed by Mr Mann, and Chairmaine Coiffeur d’Art Ltd in Haverstock Hill, run by Mr Goldstein. Wallander Ltd sold wigs They fell out, and negotiated to separate the businesses, but these failed. Mr Goldstein brought the winding up petition alleging that he was owed £1869 16s 3d in directors’ fees, declared by Joanita in 1959-1960 but not paid. Mr Mann did not dispute this, but argued that more than this was paid out in £15 weekly sums from 1965 to 1967. Wallands Ltd argued it was owed £340 16s 6d for goods from Charmaine Ltd’s subsidiary, while the Manns argued that this was in fact owed by another company, Charmaine Marguerite Ltd.

Judgment
Ungoed Thomas J held that the winding up petition could not succeed. It would be an abuse of process to ask for a winding up petition when a debt was bona fide under dispute. Here, the parties were actually disputing the existence of the debt, so the winding up petition had to be rejected. His judgment was as follows.

See also

UK insolvency law

Notes

References
L Sealy and S Worthington, Cases and Materials in Company Law (9th edn OUP 2010)
R Goode, Principles of Corporate Insolvency Law (4th edn Sweet & Maxwell 2011)

United Kingdom insolvency case law
High Court of Justice cases
1968 in case law
1968 in British law